Albert Horace "Tommy" Hopper (10 April 1915 – 1972) was an English footballer who represented Great Britain at the 1948 Summer Olympics. Hopper played amateur football for Bromley and Canterbury City.

References

External links

1915 births
1972 deaths
English footballers
Bromley F.C. players
Canterbury City F.C. players
Footballers at the 1948 Summer Olympics
Olympic footballers of Great Britain
Association football forwards